Santana is a parish in the municipality of Nordeste in the Azores.  It is split by a stream into two localities known as Feteira Grande and Feteira Pequena. The population in 2011 was 475, in an area of 6.12 km². It contains the localities Feteira Grande and Feteira Pequena.

References

Santana